Jason C. McLean is a Montreal-based writer, journalist, actor, theatre activist and a co-founder of the Forget the Box Media Collective where he currently serves as the Editor-in-Chief of the group's principal site ForgetTheBox.net.

Born in Montreal in 1977, McLean has performed on stage, on film, on Web-TV and in numerous culture jams.

In 2003, he joined Optative Theatrical Laboratories and has since performed with this dramatic collective in the long-running theatre experiment Car Stories, the anti-racist deconstruction Sinking Neptune and various guerrilla theatre performances targeting Starbucks, American Apparel and other companies.

In 2004, McLean co-founded the infringement Festival with fellow Optative members Donovan King and Gary St-Laurent.  The festival is currently in five cities.  McLean is an organizer of the international circuit and the annual Montreal event.

In 2009, he co-founded the Forget The Box Media Collective. He currently serves as Editor-In-Chief and contributes to the site regularly and hosts the site's bi-weekly podcast. He was also the in-character host of JC Sunshine's Fireside Chat, a comedic web-TV talk show with fictional narrative elements produced by Forget The Box Studios.

McLean holds a Bachelor of Arts degree in Journalism from Concordia University, was the original editor of the now-defunct Indie Theatre Times and Review and has been published in the Montreal Mirror.

McLean is a former member of the Quebec Drama Federation board of directors.

Organization 
 Forget The Box Media Collective 2009 to present
 infringement Montreal 2004 to 2014
 infringement International 2005 to present
 Optative Theatrical Laboratories 2004 to present

Theatre (limited) 
 Car Stories/sCARe Stories Optative Theatrical Laboratories, Montreal, Ottawa, Toronto, Buffalo, New York City (2003–present)
 Sinking Neptune II Optative Theatrical Laboratories, Montreal, Guelph, Quebec City (2008)
 The Mutilation of San Pedro Frente Ampilio Oppositor & Optative Theatrical Laboratories, 2007
 Sinking Neptune Optative Theatrical Laboratories, Montreal, Halifax, Annapolis Royal (2006)
 Rachel's Words: The Words About the Words Optative Theatrical Laboratories, 2005
 Dead Dolls Cabaret Travesty Theatre, 1999-2005
 Mumbo, Jumbo: King Leopold's Opus Travesty Theatre, 2002

Film and Video (limited) 
 JC Sunshine's Fireside Chat Forget The Box, bi-weekly, beginning 2009
 Car Stories: The Church of Capitalism Guerilla Video Productions, 2007
 American Apparel: Fake Revolution Guerilla Video Productions, 2006
 Death by Latte CPO Productions, 2005
 The Legend of Jackie Robinson Circle K Productions, 2005

Journalism 
 "Staging Dissent" by Jason McLean, Montreal Mirror, September 2, 2004

References

External links 
 Jason C. McLean's personal website and blog
 infringement Festival
 Forget The Box Media Collective
 Jason C. McLean's bio page on Forget The Box
 Optative Theatrical Laboratories
 JC Sunshine's Fireside Chat fansite

Living people
1977 births
Canadian male journalists
Canadian male non-fiction writers
Canadian male stage actors
Journalists from Montreal
Male actors from Montreal
Writers from Montreal
Concordia University alumni